The 2007 Virginia Cavaliers football team represented the University of Virginia in the 2007 NCAA Division I FBS football season. The team's head coach was coach Al Groh. They played their home games at Scott Stadium in Charlottesville, Virginia.

Preseason
The Cavaliers and coach Al Groh face a pivotal season in 2007 as they attempt to overcome their losing record in 2006. While the defense made improvements under new coordinator Mike London, the offense struggled all season. In November 2006, Groh indicated that he was not ready to "anoint" Jameel Sewell, who started the final nine games of 2006, as the unquestioned quarterback for 2007.

The Cavaliers were a young team in 2006, leading Groh to joke that the 2007 team was playing the 2006 season. While Groh had frequently played true freshman in earlier seasons, sometime for very limited action, he redshirted the entire freshman class in 2006 except for defensive lineman Nate Collins. Several players from that class are expected to be contributors in 2007, in particular running back Keith Payne has generated excitement among fans. Several talented true freshmen, such as quarterback Peter Lalich, joined the team in 2007.

Schedule

Coaching staff

Players

Recruiting
The Virginia Cavalier 2007 recruiting class consisted of 24 signed players. The class is headlined by quarterback Peter Lalich, outside linebacker J'Courtney Williams and wide receiver Dontrelle Inman. Overall, the 2007 Virginia recruiting class was ranked #25 by rivals.com and #32 by scout.com.

Roster
Virginia's first official depth chart for the 2007 football season was announced August 28, prior to the Cavaliers' season opener against Wyoming on September 1. Click here to see depth charts for each individual game.

Watch list
 Jameel Sewell
 Davey O'Brien Award
 Chris Long
 Pre–season All American
 Mid–season All American (Rivals, Sports Illustrated, CollegeFootballNews.com and Phil Steele's College Football Preview)
 Outland Trophy
 Lombardi Award
 Chuck Bednarik Award
 Bronko Nagurski Trophy
 Ted Hendricks Award
 Lott Trophy
 Tom Santi
 John Mackey Award
 Draddy Trophy – semi-finalist

Game summaries

Wyoming

With only 110 yards of total offense and just 7 yards on the ground, the Cavaliers were outmatched by a better-prepared Wyoming team.

Duke

Tight end Tom Santi scored two touchdowns and tailback Cedric Peerman ran for 137 yards with 1 touchdown. Quarterbacks Jameel Sewell and Peter Lalich platooned for 191 yards through the air and one touchdown.

North Carolina

Place kicker Chris Gould tied the school record held by Rafael Garcia (versus Virginia Tech, 1994) and Connor Hughes (versus Georgia Tech, 2003) by making five field goals and Cedric Peerman set a career-high in rushing for 186 yards and 1 touchdown on 30 carries. It represents the first road triumph since 2006's Sept. 30 victory at Duke and just the second since a Sept. 17, 2005, win at Syracuse.

Georgia Tech

Virginia survived Georgia Tech erasing a 14-point deficit and hung on to win their third straight ACC game 28–23. Tailback Cedric Peerman ran for 138 yards and scored a touchdown while punter Ryan Weigand averaged 47.5 yards on 8 punts with a long of 58 to keep Georgia Tech's offense at bay. Two key turnovers, an interception and fumble led to Virginia touchdowns. Defensive end Chris Long anchored the Cavalier defense with nine tackles including one for loss as well as two batted balls, one returned for a touchdown by fellow lineman Jeffery Fitzgerald, and a game-saving sack on 4th down late in the 4th quarter. Virginia quarterbacks combined to go 20 for 35 with one interception and one touchdown.

Pittsburgh

Virginia dominated the first quarter jumping out to a 27–0 lead. Pittsburgh's offense sputtered throughout the contest allowing the Cavaliers to take advantage of excellent field position. Jameel Sewell went 16 of 31 for 169 yards and three touchdowns while Cedric Peerman continued excelling on the ground with 87 yards on 24 carries.

Middle Tennessee State

Place kicker Chris Gould kicked a 34 yard field goal with 8-seconds left to secure a last second victory. Virginia running backs combined for 151 yards on the ground while quarterback Jameel Sewell threw for 223 yards with an interception and a touchdown. Despite being huge underdogs, Middle Tennessee hung around the entire game and led by one late due to a blocked extra point. Virginia's decisive scoring drive started from their own 20 with less than two minutes to go and no time outs.

Connecticut

With a strong defensive effort, the Virginia Cavaliers held off the previously undefeated Connecticut Huskies 17-16. Despite a very poor outing from Jameel Sewell, the Cavs drove the length of the field with Chris Gould chipping in a 19 yard field goal to win the game. The win propelled Virginia to be ranked #24 in the Coaches Poll and #19 in the first BCS rankings for the first time in 3 years.

Maryland

In another last minute victory, tailback Mikell Simpson scored the game-winning touchdown with 16 seconds left. The play had to be reviewed by the officials due to the ball leaving Simpson's hands as he dove across the line, but the touchdown stood giving Virginia their seventh victory in a row. Defensive end Chris Long tackled Maryland quarterback Chris Turner in the end zone for a critical safety late in the third quarter bringing the Virginia deficit down to five.

N.C. State

N.C. State quarterback Daniel Evans threw for 347 yards and 3 touchdowns while wide receiver Donal Bowens was on the receiving end of 202 of those yards. Despite a poor performance from the Virginia defense, the Virginia offense still scraped together 24 points on a streaky night by quarterback Jameel Sewell.

Wake Forest

Virginia running back Mikell Simpson scored the go ahead touchdown with 2:18 left in the 4th quarter and Wake Forest kicker Sam Swank missed a 48 yard field goal with 2 seconds left sealing the Virginia victory. The Virginia defense was anchored by defensive end Chris Long who recorded 10 tackles and a sack. The win was Virginia's 5th win this season by two points or less breaking the NCAA record set by Columbia in 1971.

Miami

On an emotional night for the Miami Hurricanes as they played their last game in the historic Miami Orange Bowl, the Cavaliers dominated all facets of the game shutting out the home team 48-0. Quarterback Jameel Sewell completed 20 of 25 passes for 288 yards, threw for a touchdown and ran for one as well. Tailback Mikell Simpson contributed 93 yards and two one-yard touchdown carries. The Cavalier defense posted three interceptions, four sacks, two fumble recoveries, seven tackles for loss and a touchdown. The win set up a Thanksgiving match-up versus cross-state rival Virginia Tech playing for the Atlantic Coast Conference Coastal Division title and the chance to play in the 3rd Annual Atlantic Coast Conference Championship game.

Virginia Tech

In a game with a trip to the conference championship game on the line, the Cavaliers fell flat against their in-state rivals Virginia Tech. Poor clock management and poor defense allowed Virginia Tech to exploit Virginia en route to an easy 33–21 win.

Gator Bowl – Texas Tech

Statistics

Team

Scores by quarter

Offense

Rushing

Passing

Receiving

Defense

Special teams

After the season

Awards

 Al Groh
 ACC Coach of the Year
 Chris Long
 Unanimous All-American
 Associated Press First-Team All America Team
 Football Writers of America Association First-Team All-America Team
 American Football Coaches Association First-Team All-America Team
 Walter Camp Football Foundation First-Team All-America
 The Sporting News First-Team All-America
 CBSSports.com First-Team All-America
 Rivals.com First-Team All-America
 Ted Hendricks Award winner as the nation's top defensive end
 First-Team All-Atlantic Coast Conference
 Dudley Award winner as the top collegiate player in the state of Virginia
 Richmond Touchdown Club Defensive Lineman of the Year
 ACC Defensive Player of the Year
 Branden Albert
 Associated Press Third-Team All America Team
 Tom Santi
 ACC James E. Tatum Award (top senior student-athlete)

References

Virginia
Virginia Cavaliers football seasons
Virginia Cavaliers football